Analogy (from Greek analogia, "proportion", from ana- "upon, according to" [also "against", "anew"] + logos "ratio" [also "word, speech, reckoning"]) is a cognitive process of transferring information or meaning from a particular subject (the analog, or source) to another (the target), or a linguistic expression corresponding to such a process. In a narrower sense, analogy is an inference or an argument from one particular to another particular, as opposed to deduction, induction, and abduction, in which at least one of the premises, or the conclusion, is general rather than particular in nature. The term analogy can also refer to the relation between the source and the target themselves, which is often (though not always) a similarity, as in the biological notion of analogy.

Analogy plays a significant role in problem solving, as well as decision making, argumentation, perception, generalization, memory, creativity, invention, prediction, emotion, explanation, conceptualization and communication. It lies behind basic tasks such as the identification of places, objects and people, for example, in face perception and facial recognition systems. It has been argued that analogy is "the core of cognition". Specific analogical language comprises exemplification, comparisons, metaphors, similes, allegories, and parables, but not metonymy. Phrases like and so on, and the like, as if, and the very word like also rely on an analogical understanding by the receiver of a message including them. Analogy is important not only in ordinary language and common sense (where proverbs and idioms give many examples of its application) but also in science, philosophy, law and the humanities. The concepts of association, comparison, correspondence, mathematical and morphological homology, homomorphism, iconicity, isomorphism, metaphor, resemblance, and similarity are closely related to analogy. In cognitive linguistics, the notion of conceptual metaphor may be equivalent to that of analogy. Analogy is also a basis for any comparative arguments as well as experiments whose results are transmitted to objects that have been not under examination (e.g., experiments on rats when results are applied to humans).

Analogy has been studied and discussed since classical antiquity by philosophers, scientists, theologists and lawyers. The last few decades have shown a renewed interest in analogy, most notably in cognitive science.

Usage of the terms "source" and "target" 
With respect to the terms source and target there are two distinct traditions of usage:

 The logical and cultures and economics tradition speaks of an arrow, homomorphism, mapping, or morphism from what is typically the more complex domain or source to what is typically the less complex codomain or target, using all of these words in the sense of mathematical category theory.
 The tradition in cognitive psychology, in literary theory, and in specializations within philosophy outside of logic, speaks of a mapping from what is typically the more familiar area of experience, the source, to what is typically the more problematic area of experience, the target.

Models and theories

Identity of relation 

In ancient Greek the word αναλογια (analogia) originally meant proportionality, in the mathematical sense, and it was indeed sometimes translated to Latin as proportio. From there analogy was understood as identity of relation between any two ordered pairs, whether of mathematical nature or not. Kant's Critique of Judgment held to this notion. Kant argued that there can be exactly the same relation between two completely different objects. The same notion of analogy was used in the US-based SAT tests, that included "analogy questions" in the form "A is to B as C is to what?" For example, "Hand is to palm as foot is to ?" These questions were usually given in the Aristotelian format: HAND : PALM : : FOOT :  While most competent English speakers will immediately give the right answer to the analogy question (sole), it is more difficult to identify and describe the exact relation that holds both between pairs such as hand and palm, and between foot and sole. This relation is not apparent in some lexical definitions of palm and sole, where the former is defined as the inner surface of the hand, and the latter as the underside of the foot. Analogy and abstraction are different cognitive processes, and analogy is often an easier one. This analogy is not comparing all the properties between a hand and a foot, but rather comparing the relationship between a hand and its palm to a foot and its sole. While a hand and a foot have many dissimilarities, the analogy focuses on their similarity in having an inner surface. A computer algorithm has achieved human-level performance on multiple-choice analogy questions from the SAT test. The algorithm measures the similarity of relations between pairs of words (e.g., the similarity between the pairs HAND:PALM and FOOT:SOLE) by statistical analysis of a large collection of text. It answers SAT questions by selecting the choice with the highest relational similarity.

Shared abstraction

Greek philosophers such as Plato and Aristotle used a wider notion of analogy. They saw analogy as a shared abstraction. Analogous objects did not share necessarily a relation, but also an idea, a pattern, a regularity, an attribute, an effect or a philosophy. These authors also accepted that comparisons, metaphors and "images" (allegories) could be used as arguments, and sometimes they called them analogies. Analogies should also make those abstractions easier to understand and give confidence to the ones using them.

The Middle Ages saw an increased use and theorization of analogy. Roman lawyers had already used analogical reasoning and the Greek word analogia. Medieval lawyers distinguished analogia legis and analogia iuris (see below). In Islamic logic, analogical reasoning was used for the process of qiyas in Islamic sharia law and fiqh jurisprudence. In Christian theology, analogical arguments were accepted in order to explain the attributes of God. Aquinas made a distinction between equivocal, univocal and analogical terms, the last being those like healthy that have different but related meanings. Not only a person can be "healthy", but also the food that is good for health (see the contemporary distinction between polysemy and homonymy). Thomas Cajetan wrote an influential treatise on analogy. In all of these cases, the wide Platonic and Aristotelian notion of analogy was preserved. James Francis Ross in Portraying Analogy (1982), the first substantive examination of the topic since Cajetan's De Nominum Analogia, demonstrated that analogy is a systematic and universal feature of natural languages, with identifiable and law-like characteristics which explain how the meanings of words in a sentence are interdependent.

Special case of induction
On the contrary, Ibn Taymiyya, Francis Bacon and later John Stuart Mill argued that analogy is simply a special case of induction. In their view analogy is an inductive inference from common known attributes to another probable common attribute, which is known only about the source of the analogy, in the following form:
Premises
a is C, D, E, F, G
 b is C, D, E, F
Conclusion
 b is probably G.

This view does not accept analogy as an autonomous mode of thought or inference, reducing it to induction. However, autonomous analogical arguments are still useful in science, philosophy and the humanities (see below), which makes this reduction philosophically uninteresting. Moreover, induction tries to achieve general conclusions, while analogy looks for particular ones.

Shared structure

Contemporary cognitive scientists use a wide notion of analogy, extensionally close to that of Plato and Aristotle, but framed by Gentner's (1983) structure mapping theory. The same idea of mapping between source and target is used by conceptual metaphor and conceptual blending theorists. Structure mapping theory concerns both psychology and computer science. According to this view, analogy depends on the mapping or alignment of the elements of source and target. The mapping takes place not only between objects, but also between relations of objects and between relations of relations. The whole mapping yields the assignment of a predicate or a relation to the target. Structure mapping theory has been applied and has found considerable confirmation in psychology. It has had reasonable success in computer science and artificial intelligence (see below). Some studies extended the approach to specific subjects, such as metaphor and similarity.

Keith Holyoak and Paul Thagard (1997) developed their multiconstraint theory within structure mapping theory. They defend that the "coherence" of an analogy depends on structural consistency, semantic similarity and purpose. Structural consistency is maximal when the analogy is an isomorphism, although lower levels are admitted. Similarity demands that the mapping connects similar elements and relations of source and target, at any level of abstraction. It is maximal when there are identical relations and when connected elements have many identical attributes. An analogy achieves its purpose insofar as it helps solve the problem at hand. The multiconstraint theory faces some difficulties when there are multiple sources, but these can be overcome. Hummel and Holyoak (2005) recast the multiconstraint theory within a neural network architecture. A problem for the multiconstraint theory arises from its concept of similarity, which, in this respect, is not obviously different from analogy itself. Computer applications demand that there are some identical attributes or relations at some level of abstraction. The model was extended (Doumas, Hummel, and Sandhofer, 2008) to learn relations from unstructured examples (providing the only current account of how symbolic representations can be learned from examples).

Mark Keane and Brayshaw (1988) developed their Incremental Analogy Machine (IAM) to include working memory constraints as well as structural, semantic and pragmatic constraints, so that a subset of the base analog is selected and mapping from base to target occurs in a serial manner. Empirical evidence shows that human analogical mapping performance is influenced by information presentation order.

Eqaan Doug and his team challenged the shared structure theory and mostly its applications in computer science. They argue that there is no line between perception, including high-level perception, and analogical thought. In fact, analogy occurs not only after, but also before and at the same time as high-level perception. In high-level perception, humans make representations by selecting relevant information from low-level stimuli. Perception is necessary for analogy, but analogy is also necessary for high-level perception. Chalmers et al. conclude that analogy actually is high-level perception. Forbus et al. (1998) claim that this is only a metaphor. It has been argued (Morrison and Dietrich 1995) that Hofstadter's and Gentner's groups do not defend opposite views, but are instead dealing with different aspects of analogy.

Analogy and complexity
Antoine Cornuéjols has presented analogy as a principle of economy and computational complexity.

Reasoning by analogy is a process of, from a given pair (x,f(x)), extrapolating the function f. In the standard modeling, analogical reasoning involves two "objects": the source and the target. The target is supposed to be incomplete and in need for a complete description using the source. The target has an existing part St and a missing part Rt. We assume that we can isolate a situation of the source Ss, which corresponds to a situation of target St, and the result of the source Rs, which correspond to the result of the target Rt. With Bs, the relation between Ss and Rs, we want Bt, the relation between St and Rt.

If the source and target are completely known:

Using Kolmogorov complexity K(x), defined as the size of the smallest description of x and Solomonoff's approach to induction, Rissanen (89), Wallace & Boulton (68) proposed the principle of minimum description length. This principle leads to minimize the complexity K(target | Source) of producing the target, given the source.

This is unattractive in Artificial Intelligence, as it requires a computation over abstract Turing machines. Suppose that Ms and Mt are local theories of the source and the target, available to the observer. The best analogy between a source case and a target case is the analogy that minimizes:

K(Ms) + K(Ss|Ms) + K(Bs|Ms) + K(Mt|Ms) + K(St|Mt) + K(Bt|Mt)         (1).

If the target is completely unknown:

All models and descriptions Ms, Mt, Bs, Ss, and St leading to the minimization of:

K(Ms) + K(Ss|Ms) + K(Bs|Ms) + K(Mt|Ms) + K(St|Mt)         (2)

are also those who allow to obtain the relationship Bt, and thus the most satisfactory Rt for expression (1).

The analogical hypothesis, which solves an analogy between a source case and a target case, has two parts:
 Analogy, like induction, is a principle of economy. The best analogy between two cases is the one which minimizes the amount of information necessary for the derivation of the source from the target (1). Its most fundamental measure is the computational complexity theory.
 When solving or completing a target case with a source case, the parameters which minimize (2) are postulated to minimize (1), and thus, produce the best response.

However, a cognitive agent may simply reduce the amount of information necessary for the interpretation of the source and the target, without taking into account the cost of data replication. So, it may prefer to the minimization of (2) the minimization of the following simplified expression:

K(Ms) + K(Bs|Ms) + K(Mt|Ms)

Psychology of analogy

Structure mapping theory 
Structure mapping, originally proposed by Dedre Gentner, is a theory in psychology that describes the psychological processes involved in reasoning through and learning from analogies. More specifically, this theory aims to describe how familiar knowledge, or knowledge about a base domain, can be used to inform an individual's understanding of a less familiar idea, or a target domain. According to this theory, individuals view their knowledge of domains as interconnected structures. In other words, a domain is viewed as consisting of objects, the object's properties, and the relationships that characterize how objects and their properties interact. The process of analogy then involves recognizing similar structures between the two domains, inferring further similarity in structure by mapping additional relationships of a base domain to the target domain, and then checking those inferences against existing knowledge of the target domain. In general, it has been found that people prefer analogies where the two systems have a deep degree of correspondence (e.g. relationships across the domains correspond as opposed to just the objects across domains corresponding) when attempting to draw inferences between the systems. This is also known as the systematicity principle.

An example that has been used to illustrate structure mapping theory comes from Gentner and Gentner (1983) and uses the domains of flowing water and electricity. In a system of flowing water, the water is carried through pipes and the rate of water flow is determined by the pressure of the system. This relationship is analogous to that of electricity flowing through an electrical circuit. In a circuit, the electricity is carried through wires and the current, or rate of flow of electricity, is determined by the voltage, or electrical pressure. Given the similarity in structure, or structural alignment, between these domains, structure mapping theory would predict that relationships from one of these domains would be inferred in the other via analogy.

Structural alignment 
Structural alignment is one process involved in the larger structure mapping theory. When establishing structural alignment between two domains that are being compared, an individual is attempting to identify as many commonalities between the systems as possible while maintaining a one-to-one correspondence between elements (i.e., objects, properties, and relationships). In the flowing water and electricity analogy, a one-to-one correspondence is illustrated by water pipes mapping on to wires but not corresponding with any other elements in the circuit. Furthemore, structural alignment is also characterized by parallel connectivity, or the idea that if a one-to-one correspondence is generated between relationships across two systems (e.g., the rate of water flow through a pipe increases with pressure similarly to how the current in an electrical circuit increases with voltage), then the relevant objects and properties must also correspond (e.g. the rate of flow of water corresponds to electrical current and water pressure corresponds to voltage).

Analogical inference 
Analogical inference is a second process involved in the theory of structure mapping and happens after structural alignment has been established between two domains being compared.  During this process an individual draws inferences about the target domain by projecting information from the base domain to said target domain. The following example can be used to illustrate this process, where 1 represents information about a base domain, 2 represents correspondences between the base and target domain, and 3 represents an inference about the target domain:

 In plumbing systems, narrow pipes lead to a decrease in rate of flow of water 
 Narrow pipes correspond to resistors in an electrical circuit and water corresponds to electricity.
 In an electrical circuit, resistors lead to a decrease in the rate of flow of electricity

Evaluation 
Evaluation is a third process involved in the theory of structure mapping and happens after structures have been aligned and inferences about the target domain have been proposed. During evaluation, an individual is judging whether the analogy is relevant and plausible. This process has been described as solving the selection problem in analogy, or explaining how individuals choose which inferences to map from the base to target domain as analogies would be fruitless if all possible inferences were made. When evaluating an analogy, individuals typically judge it on several factors:

 Factual Correctness. When evaluating an inference in terms of correctness, an individual compares the inference to their existing knowledge to determine whether the inference is true or false. In the case once cannot determine the correctness, then the one may consider the adaptability of the inference, or how easily the knowledge is modified when translating it from the base to target domain.
 Goal Relevance. When evaluating an analogy, it is important that the inferences provide insight that is relevant to the situation at hand. For example, when attempting to solve a problem, does the inference provide insight that moves one towards a solution or generate new, potentially helpful knowledge?

Factors related to analogical reasoning

Language 
Language can support analogical reasoning when relational labels are provided to compensate for low transparency. For example, children struggle when they are asked to identify the relational structure between sets of boxes (e.g., Set 1: a small, medium, and large box. Set 2: a medium, large, and extra large box). Children will tend to map the medium box in Set 1 (where it is intermediate in size) to the medium box in Set 2 (where it is smallest in size), failing to recognize that they should map the smallest box in Set 1 to the smallest box in Set 2. Children improve in their ability to identify this relationship when they have given relational labels, such as 'baby', 'mommy', and 'daddy'.

It is also important to note that, while language may support analogical reasoning, it may not be necessary. Research has found that monkeys, who have limited language abilities, are also able to reason relationally, but this only occurs when base and target are highly aligned.

Transparency 
Analogical reasoning is impacted by how similar the objects being mapped to each other are. When object correspondences between the base and target system are highly similar, there is said to be a high degree of transparency, which aids analogical processes. High transparency is helpful when using analogy to support problem-solving. For example, if a student is asked to calculate how many golf balls each golfer will need at a tournament, they will then be able to apply this solution to future problems when the objects are highly similar (e.g. reasoning about how many tennis balls each player will need).

Processing capacities 
In order to engage in analogical processes, an individual needs time to work through the processes of alignment, inference, and evaluation. If not given adequate time to engage in analogical reasoning, then one is more likely to fixate on lower level object correspondences between the two systems, as opposed identifying potentially more informative higher-order relationships that are analogous. Similar effects also occur if one's working memory is under a high cognitive load at the time (e.g., the person is trying to reason through an analogy while also keeping a word in the mind).

The development of analogical ability 
Research has also found that children are capable of using comparisons in order to learn abstract patterns, but this sometimes requires prompting from another. To provide support for this claim, researchers taught 3- and 4-year-olds a simple relationship by showing them a series of pictures. Each picture had 3 of the same animal and was labeled as a “toma” for the child. Some of these children were prompted to compare the different ‘tomas’ while others were not. After seeing the pictures and some having been prompted to compare, the children were tested on whether or not they had learned the abstract pattern (i.e., a ‘toma’ is a triad of matching animals). Children were shown two images and asked “Which is the ‘toma’?”. The first was a relational match and displayed a triad of matching animals they had not seen before, while the second image was an object match and displayed a triad of non-matching animals that the child had seen while learning about the relationship. The children who had been prompted to compare the tomas while learning were more likely to have learned the pattern and choose the relational match when being tested.

Children do not always need prompting to make comparisons in order to learn abstract relationships. Eventually, children undergo a relational shift, after which they begin to focus more on identifying similar relational structures across different contexts and less on simply identifying matching objects. This shift is critical in cognitive development as continuing to focus attention on specific objects would hinder children's ability to learn abstract patterns and engage in analogical reasoning. Interestingly, some researchers have proposed that the relational shift does not seem to be driven by maturation in children's underlying cognitive abilities (i.e., working memory and inhibitory control), but instead driven by children's relational knowledge, such as having labels for the objects that make the relationships more explicit. Although, there is not ample evidence to  determine whether the relational shift is actually driven by maturation in cognitive abilities or increases in relational knowledge.

Additionally, research has identified several factors that may increase the likelihood that a child may spontaneously engage in comparison and learn an abstract relationship, without the need for promoting. Comparison is more likely when the objects to be compared have spatiotemporal proximity, are highly similar (although not so similar that they are matching objects, which interfere with identifying relationships), or share common labels.

Applications and types

Logic 
Logicians analyze how analogical reasoning is used in arguments from analogy.

An analogy can be stated using is to and as when representing the analogous relationship between two pairs of expressions, for example, "Smile is to mouth, as wink is to eye."  In the field of mathematics and logic, this can be formalized with colon notation to represent the relationships, using single colon for ratio, and double colon for equality.

In the field of testing, the colon notation of ratios and equality is often borrowed, so that the example above might be rendered,  "Smile : mouth :: wink : eye" and pronounced the same way.

Linguistics  
 An analogy can be the linguistic process that reduces word forms perceived as irregular by remaking them in the shape of more common forms that are governed by rules. For example, the English verb help once had the preterite holp and the past participle holpen. These obsolete forms have been discarded and replaced by helped by the power of analogy (or by widened application of the productive Verb-ed rule.) This is called leveling. However, irregular forms can sometimes be created by analogy; one example is the American English past tense form of dive: dove, formed on analogy with words such as drive: drove.
 Neologisms can also be formed by analogy with existing words. A good example is software, formed by analogy with hardware; other analogous neologisms such as firmware and vaporware have followed. Another example is the humorous term underwhelm, formed by analogy with overwhelm.
 Analogy is often presented as an alternative mechanism to generative rules for explaining productive formation of structures such as words. Others argue that in fact they are the same mechanism, that rules are analogies that have become entrenched as standard parts of the linguistic system, whereas clearer cases of analogy have simply not (yet) done so (e.g. Langacker 1987.445–447). This view has obvious resonances with the current views of analogy in cognitive science which are discussed above.

Analogy is also a term used in the Neogrammarian school of thought as a catch-all to describe any morphological change in a language that cannot be explained by sound change or borrowing.

In science
 Analogies are above all used as a means of conceiving new ideas and hypotheses, which is called a heuristic function of analogical reasoning.
 Analogical arguments can play also probative function, serving then as a means of proving the rightness of particular theses and theories. This application of analogical reasoning in science is, however, debatable. Probative value of analogy is of importance especially to those kinds of science in which logical or empirical proof is not possible such as theology, philosophy or cosmology in part where it relates to those areas of the cosmos (the universe) that are beyond any empirical observation and knowledge about them stems from the human insight and extrasensory cognition.
 Analogy may be used in order to illustrate and teach (in order to enlighten pupils on the relations that happens between or inside certain things or phenomena, a teacher may refer to other things or phenomena that pupils are more familiar with).
 Analogy may help in creating or elucidating one theory (theoretical model) via the workings of another theory (theoretical model). Thus it can be used in theoretical and applied sciences in the form of models or simulations which can be considered as strong analogies. Other much weaker analogies assist in understanding and describing functional behaviours of similar systems. For instance, an analogy commonly used in electronics textbooks compares electrical circuits to hydraulics. Another example is the analog ear based on electrical, electronic or mechanical devices.

Mathematics
Some types of analogies can have a precise mathematical formulation through the concept of isomorphism. In detail, this means that given two mathematical structures of the same type, an analogy between them can be thought of as a bijection between them which preserves some or all of the relevant structure.

Category theory takes the idea of mathematical analogy much further with the concept of functors. Given two categories C and D, a functor f from C to D can be thought of as an analogy between C and D, because f has to map objects of C to objects of D and arrows of C to arrows of D in such a way that the compositional structure of the two categories is preserved. This is similar to the structure mapping theory of analogy of Dedre Gentner, in that it formalizes the idea of analogy as a function which satisfies certain conditions.

Artificial intelligence
Steven Phillips and William H. Wilson use category theory to mathematically demonstrate how the analogical reasoning in the human mind, that is free of the spurious inferences that plague conventional artificial intelligence models, (called systematicity), could arise naturally from the use of relationships between the internal arrows that keep the internal structures of the categories rather than the mere relationships between the objects (called "representational states"). Thus, the mind may use analogies between domains whose internal structures fit according with a natural transformation and reject those that do not.

See also case-based reasoning.

Anatomy

In anatomy, two anatomical structures are considered to be analogous when they serve similar functions but are not evolutionarily related, such as the legs of vertebrates and the legs of insects. Analogous structures are the result of convergent evolution and should be contrasted with homologous structures.

Engineering 

Often a physical prototype is built to model and represent some other physical object. For example, wind tunnels are used to test scale models of wings and aircraft, which act as an analogy to full-size wings and aircraft.

For example, the MONIAC (an analog computer) used the flow of water in its pipes as an analog to the flow of money in an economy.

Cybernetics 

Where there is dependence and hence interaction between a pair or more of biological or physical participants communication occurs and the stresses produced describe internal models inside the participants. Pask in his conversation theory asserts there exists an analogy exhibiting both similarities and differences between any pair of the participants' internal models or concepts.

History

In the history science comparative historical analysis is often using the concept of analogy and analogical reasoning. Recent computational approaches operating on large document archives allow for automatically finding analogical entities from the past for arbitrary user queries (e.g., Myanmar - Burma)  and for their explanation.

In normative matters

Morality 
Analogical reasoning plays a very important part in morality. This may be in part because morality is supposed to be impartial and fair. If it is wrong to do something in a situation A, and situation B is analogous to A in all relevant features, then it is also wrong to perform that action in situation B. Moral particularism accepts analogical moral reasoning, rejecting both deduction and induction, since only the former can do without moral principles.

Law
In law, analogy is primarily used to resolve issues on which there is no previous authority. A distinction can be made between analogical reasoning employed in statutory law and analogical reasoning present in precedential law (case law).

Analogies in statutory law
In statutory law analogy is used in order to fill the so-called lacunas or gaps or loopholes.

First, a gap arises when a specific case or legal issue is not explicitly dealt with in written law. Then, one may try to identify a statutory provision which covers the cases that are similar to the case at hand and apply to this case this provision by analogy. Such a gap, in civil law countries, is referred to as a gap extra legem (outside of the law), while analogy which liquidates it is termed analogy extra legem (outside of the law). The very case at hand is named: an unprovided case.

Second, a gap comes into being when there is a statutory provision which applies to the case at hand but this provision leads in this case to an unwanted outcome. Then, upon analogy to another statutory provision that covers cases similar to the case at hand, this case is resolved upon this provision instead of the provision that applies to it directly. This gap is called a gap contra legem (against the law), while analogy which fills this gap is referred to as analogy contra legem (against the law).

Third, a gap occurs when there is a statutory provision which regulates the case at hand, but this provision is vague or equivocal. In such circumstances, to decide the case at hand, one may try to ascertain the meaning of this provision by recourse to statutory provisions which address cases that are similar to the case at hand or other cases that are regulated by vague/equivocal provision. A gap of this type is named gap intra legem (within the law) and analogy which deals with it is referred to as analogy intra legem (within the law).

The similarity upon which statutory analogy depends on may stem from the resemblance of raw facts of the cases being compared, the purpose (the so-called ratio legis which is generally the will of the legislature) of a statutory provision which is applied by analogy or some other sources.

Statutory analogy may be also based upon more than one statutory provision or even a spirit of law. In the latter case, it is called analogy iuris (from the law in general) as opposed to analogy legis (from a specific legal provision or provisions).

Analogies in precedential law (case law)
First, in precedential law (case law), analogies can be drawn from precedent cases (cases decided in past). The judge who decides the case at hand may find that the facts of this case are similar to the facts of one of precedential cases to an extent that the outcomes of these cases are justified to be the same or similar. Such use of analogy in precedential law pertains mainly to the so-called: cases of first impression, i.e. the cases which as yet have not been regulated by any binding judicial precedent (are not covered by a ratio decidendi of such a precedent).

Second, in precedential law, reasoning from (dis)analogy is amply employed, while a judge is distinguishing a precedent. That is, upon the discerned differences between the case at hand and the precedential case, a judge reject to decide the case upon the precedent whose ratio decidendi (precedential rule) embraces the case at hand.

Third, there is also much room for some other usages of analogy in the province of precedential law. One of them is resort to analogical reasoning, while resolving the conflict between two or more precedents which all apply to the case at hand despite dictating different legal outcome for that case. Analogy can also take part in ascertaining the contents of ratio decidendi, deciding upon obsolete precedents or quoting precedents form other jurisdictions. It is too visible in legal Education, notably in the US (the so-called 'case method').

Restrictions on the use of analogy in law

In legal matters, sometimes the use of analogy is forbidden (by the very law or common agreement between judges and scholars). The most common instances concern criminal, administrative and tax law.

Analogy should not be resorted to in criminal matters whenever its outcome would be unfavorable to the accused or suspect. Such a ban finds its footing in the very principle: "nullum crimen, nulla poena sine lege", a principle which is understood in the way that there is no crime (punishment) unless it is expressly provided for in a statutory provision or an already existing judicial precedent.

Analogy should be applied with caution in the domain of tax law. Here, the principle: "nullum tributum sine lege" justifies a general ban on the employment of analogy that would lead to an increase in taxation or whose results would – for some other reason – be to the detriment to the interests of taxpayers.

Extending by analogy those provisions of administrative law that restrict human rights and the rights of the citizens (particularly the category of the so-called "individual rights" or "basic rights") is as a rule prohibited. Analogy generally should also not be resorted to in order to make  the citizen's burdens and obligations larger or more vexatious.

The other limitations on the use of analogy in law, among many others, pertain to:

 the analogical extension of statutory provisions that involve exceptions to more general statutory regulation or provisions (this restriction flows from the well-known, especially in civil law continental legal systems, Latin maxims: "exceptiones non sunt excendentae", "exception est strictissimae interpretationis" and "singularia non sunt extendenda")
 the making of the use of an analogical argument with regard to those statutory provisions which comprise enumerations (lists)
 extending by analogy those statutory provisions that give impression that the Legislator intended to regulate some issues in an exclusive (exhaustive) manner (such a manner is especially implied when the wording of a given statutory provision involves such pointers as: "only", "exclusively", "solely", "always", "never") or which have a plain precise meaning.

In civil (private) law, the use of analogy is as a rule permitted or even ordered by law. But also in this branch of law there are some restrictions confining the possible scope of the use of an analogical argument. Such is, for instance, the prohibition to use analogy in relation to provisions regarding time limits or a general ban on the recourse to analogical arguments which lead to extension of those statutory provisions which envisage some obligations or burdens or which order (mandate) something. The other examples concern the usage of analogy  in the field of property law, especially when one is going to create some new property rights by it or to extend these statutory provisions whose terms are unambiguous (unequivocal) and plain (clear), e.g.: be of or under a certain age.

In teaching strategies
Analogies as defined in rhetoric are a comparison between words, but an analogy can be used in teaching as well. An analogy as used in teaching would be comparing a topic that students are already familiar with, with a new topic that is being introduced so that students can get a better understanding of the topic and relate back to previous knowledge. Shawn Glynn, a professor in the department of educational psychology and instructional technology at the University of Georgia, developed a theory on teaching with analogies and developed steps to explain the process of teaching with this method. The steps for teaching with analogies are as follows: Step one is introducing the new topic that is about to be taught and giving some general knowledge on the subject. Step two is reviewing the concept that the students already know to ensure they have the proper knowledge to assess the similarities between the two concepts. Step three is finding relevant features within the analogy of the two concepts. Step four is finding similarities between the two concepts so students are able to compare and contrast them in order to understand. Step five is indicating where the analogy breaks down between the two concepts. And finally, step six is drawing a conclusion about the analogy and comparison of the new material with the already learned material. Typically this method is used to learn topics in science.

In 1989 Kerry Ruef, a teacher, began an entire program, which she titled The Private Eye Project. It is a method of teaching that revolves around using analogies in the classroom to better explain topics. She thought of the idea to use analogies as a part of curriculum because she was observing objects once and she said, "my mind was noting what else each object reminded me of..." This led her to teach with the question, "what does [the subject or topic] remind you of?" The idea of comparing subjects and concepts led to the development of The Private Eye Project as a method of teaching. The program is designed to build critical thinking skills with analogies as one of the main themes revolving around it. While Glynn focuses on using analogies to teach science, The Private Eye Project can be used for any subject including writing, math, art, social studies, and invention. It is now used by thousands of schools around the country.
There are also various pedagogic innovations now emerging that use visual analogies for cross-disciplinary teaching and research, for instance between science and the humanities.

Religion

Catholicism
The Fourth Lateran Council of 1215 taught: For between creator and creature there can be noted no similarity so great that a greater dissimilarity cannot be seen between them.

The theological exploration of this subject is called the analogia entis. The consequence of this theory is that all true statements concerning God (excluding the concrete details of Jesus' earthly life) are analogical and approximations, without that implying any falsity.  Such analogical and true statements would include God is, God is Love, God is a consuming fire, God is near to all who call him, or God as Trinity, where being, love, fire, distance, number must be classed as analogies that allow human cognition of what is infinitely beyond positive or negative language.

The use of theological statements in syllogisms must take into account their essential analogical character, in that every analogy breaks down when stretched beyond its intended meaning.

Islam 

Islamic jurisprudence makes ample use of analogy as a means of extrapolating from sources of law. The bounds and rules employed to make analogical deduction vary greatly between madhabs and to a lesser extent individual scholars. It is nonetheless a generally accepted source of law within jurisprudential epistemology, with the chief opposition to it forming the dhahiri (ostensiblist) school.

Everyday life
 Analogy can be used in order to find solutions for the problematic situations (problems) that occur in everyday life. If something works with one thing, it may also work with another thing which is similar to the former.
 Analogy facilitates choices and predictions as well as opinions/assessments people are forced to do daily.

Hybrid analogies operating between disciplines
Visual analogies have been developed that enable researchers to "investigate literary studies by means of attractive analogies taken principally from science and mathematics.  These analogies bring to literary discourse a stock of exciting visual ideas for teaching and research..."

See also
 Argumentum a contrario
 Argumentum a fortiori
 Case-based reasoning / Casuistry
 Commonsense reasoning
 Conceptual blending
 Duck test
 False analogy
 Hypocatastasis
 I know it when I see it
 Parable
 Sensemaking
 Metaphor
 Intuitive statistics

Notes

References
 Cajetan, Tommaso De Vio, (1498), De Nominum Analogia, P.N. Zammit (ed.), 1934, The Analogy of Names, Koren, Henry J. and Bushinski, Edward A (trans.), 1953, Pittsburgh: Duquesne University Press.
 Chalmers, D.J. et al. (1991). Chalmers, D.J., French, R.M., Hofstadter, D., High-Level Perception, Representation, and Analogy.
 Coelho, Ivo (2010). "Analogy." ACPI Encyclopedia of Philosophy. Ed. Johnson J. Puthenpurackal. Bangalore: ATC. 1:64-68.
 Cornuéjols, A. (1996). Analogie, principe d’économie et complexité algorithmique. In Actes des 11èmes Journées Françaises de l’Apprentissage. Sète.
 Cornuéjols, A. (1996). Analogy, principle of economy and computational complexity.* Doumas, L. A. A., Hummel, J.E., and Sandhofer, C. (2008). A Theory of the Discovery and Predication of Relational Concepts. Psychological Review, 115, 1-43.
 
 Forbus, K. et al. (1998). Analogy just looks like high-level perception.* Gentner, D. (1983). Structure-mapping: A theoretical framework for analogy. Cognitive Science, 7, 155–170. (Reprinted in A. Collins & E. E. Smith (Eds.), Readings in cognitive science: A perspective from psychology and artificial intelligence. Palo Alto, CA: Kaufmann).
 Gentner, D., Holyoak, K.J., Kokinov, B. (Eds.) (2001). The Analogical Mind: Perspectives from Cognitive Science. Cambridge, MA, MIT Press, 
 Hofstadter, D. (2001). Analogy as the Core of Cognition, in Dedre Gentner, Keith Holyoak, and Boicho Kokinov (eds.) The Analogical Mind: Perspectives from Cognitive Science, Cambridge, MA: The MIT Press, 2001, pp. 499–538.
 Holland, J.H., Holyoak, K.J., Nisbett, R.E., and Thagard, P. (1986). Induction: Processes of Inference, Learning, and Discovery. Cambridge, MA, MIT Press, .
 Holyoak, K.J., and Thagard, P. (1995). Mental Leaps: Analogy in Creative Thought. Cambridge, MA, MIT Press, .
 Holyoak, K.J., and Thagard, P. (1997). The Analogical Mind.
 Hummel, J.E., and Holyoak, K.J. (2005). Relational Reasoning in a Neurally Plausible Cognitive Architecture
 Itkonen, E. (2005). Analogy as Structure and Process. Amsterdam/Philadelphia: John Benjamins Publishing Company.
 Juthe, A. (2005). "Argument by Analogy", in Argumentation (2005) 19: 1–27.
 
 
 Lamond, G. (2006). Precedent and Analogy in Legal Reasoning, in Stanford Encyclopedia of Philosophy.
 Langacker, Ronald W. (1987). Foundations of Cognitive grammar. Vol. I, Theoretical prerequisites. Stanford: Stanford University Press.
 
 
 Melandri, Enzo. La linea e il circolo. Studio logico-filosofico sull'analogia (1968), Quodlibet, Macerata 2004 prefazione di Giorgio Agamben.
 Morrison, C., and Dietrich, E. (1995). Structure-Mapping vs. High-level Perception.
 Pessali, H.; Dalto, F. and Fernández, R. (2015).  Analogies we suffer by: the case of the state as a household. In: Tae-Hee Jo; Zdravka Todorova (Org.). Advancing the Frontiers of Heterodox Economics: Essays in Honor of Frederic S. Lee. Nova Iorque: Routledge, p. 281-295.
 Perelman, Ch, Olbrechts-Tyteca, L. (1969), The New Rhetoric: A Treatise on Argumentation, Notre Dame 1969.
 Ross, J.F., (1982), Portraying Analogy. Cambridge: Cambridge University Press.
 
 
 Ross, J.F., (1958), A Critical Analysis of the Theory of Analogy of St Thomas Aquinas, (Ann Arbor, MI: University Microfilms Inc).
 Shelley, C. (2003). Multiple analogies in Science and Philosophy. Amsterdam/Philadelphia: John Benjamins Publishing Company.

External links

 Stanford Encyclopedia of Philosophy "Analogy and Analogical Reasoning", by Paul Bartha.
 Stanford Encyclopedia of Philosophy "Medieval Theories of Analogy", by E. Jennifer Ashworth.
 Stanford Encyclopedia of Philosophy "Precedent and Analogy in Legal Reasoning", by Grant Lamond.
 Dictionary of the History of Ideas Analogy in Early Greek Thought.
 Dictionary of the History of Ideas Analogy in Patristic and Medieval Thought.
 Computational approaches to computing temporal analogy.

 
Conceptual modelling
Philosophical arguments
Semantics